Vera Holland (8 April 1949 – 14–16 November 1996) was a mother of three who was murdered in Reading, Berkshire in November 1996. Her murder remains unsolved.

Background 
Vera Holland was born Vera Vince in London on 8 April 1949. She married Edward Bennett in 1967 with whom she had two children. Her second husband was Richard Stevens who she married in 1978 and the couple had one child together. She married her third husband, Brian Holland, in 1991.

At the time of her death, Vera, 47, was living with her husband Brian, 41, on St Barnabas Road, Shinfield Rise, south Reading. The couple shared a milk delivery round in nearby Wokingham.

Disappearance 
On the evening of Thursday 14 November 1996, Vera left her home at 6.10 pm to make a three-minute walk to the Kentucky Fried Chicken restaurant on Shinfield Road. The time of year meant that it was dark when she left. There was no sign of her on CCTV reaching her destination and it's believed that she never made it to the restaurant. Her husband, Brian, reported her missing at 10.45 pm when Vera failed to return home. At the time of her disappearance, Vera had been wearing a three-quarter length pink coat, green tartan skirt, black jumper and black shoes.

Discovery of the crime 
Motorists on the A327 road, between Shinfield and Arborfield, alerted fire services to a blaze by the side of the road at 5.30 am on Saturday 16 November 1996 at an illegal fly-tipping site at Two Bridges. The site was about three miles south of Vera's home.

Once the fire had been extinguished, Vera's body was discovered in a beige carpet on a pile of rubbish which included logs and tyres. Traces of her blood were found on the carpet and she was partially clothed in her undergarments: a suspender belt and petticoat. The post-mortem found that Vera had died of strangulation and there was bruising to her face. There was no sign of sexual assault. The other items of clothing which Vera had been wearing at the time of her disappearance were found in the burning pile.

Police investigation 
Eighty police officers from Thames Valley Police were involved in the investigation into Vera Holland's death in the first year. At the height of the investigation 1,669 people were interviewed and 777 statements were taken. Over 100,000 leaflets appealing for information were sent out to local people.

Fingerprint and blood tests were carried out on Brian Holland and the family home was sealed for three days while forensic teams searched the house, they took away over one hundred forensic samples. A week after Vera's disappearance, road checks were held on the A327 where Vera's body was found and a female police officer, dressed in clothing like Vera's on the night she disappeared, re-enacted the walk she would have made to the KFC restaurant in the hope that someone's memory would be jogged. A fortnight after Vera's disappearance, further road checks were carried out on the A327. In February 1997, police put up two road signs in the area where Vera's body was found, appealing for information.

Witness statements provided police with a number of leads regarding vehicles in the area at the time:

 Two sightings of a light-coloured Ford Fiesta shortly after 5am on Saturday 16 November near the entrance to Hall Farm, just the other side of a bridge from the site where Vera's body was found. One witness said the car was white, another said it was beige. It was seen to drive off at speed on to the farm estate.
 A white Transit van seen several times for lengthy spells on Friday 15 November in the location where Vera's body was found.
 A black Ford Granada was seen in the area on the night when Vera went missing.

The carpet 
In February 1997, the police made an appeal for more information about the carpet which Vera’s body was found in. It was a section of bedroom quality carpet measuring 9ft 4in by 8ft 2in square and was fawn coloured / beige. It had two furniture sized indentations on one side – possibly from matching pieces of bedroom furniture - and two radiator pipe holes on the opposite side. Soil and weeds growing on the carpet led police to believe that it had been stored outside before. Police believed that Vera’s body had been left inside the carpet for more than a day before it was taken to the fly-tip – they believed she was killed and then placed in the carpet until the Friday evening. Witnesses stated that Vera’s body was not at the site before 4pm on Friday 15 November. After the appeal was made, police said that almost forty people contacted them with information about the carpet.

Arrests 
On 17 December 1996, at 6.30am, Vera's second husband, Richard Stevens, 50, and his wife, Kaye, 42, were arrested. Mr and Mrs Stevens lived just a few houses from Vera and her husband, Brian. The couple were held for 13 hours then released on police bail.

In January 1997, Vera's husband, Brian, was arrested in connection with her death. He was held for a day before being released on police bail. In March 1997, Brian Holland threatened to take legal action against Thames Valley Police over the handling of his wife's case.

No one else has been arrested or charged in connection with Vera Holland's death.

Funeral and inquest 
On Friday 20 June 1997, Vera Holland's funeral was held at Caversham Crematorium, Reading. On 16 October 1997, the inquest into Vera's death recorded a verdict of unlawful killing. The East Berkshire coroner, Robert Wilson, told the inquest, "It looks like the person who did this will get away with it."

Developments in recent years 
In November 2016, on the twenty year anniversary of Vera's death, two of her children made a new appeal for information alongside Thames Valley Police. When asked at the time about a possible connection of Vera's death with imprisoned serial killer, Christoper Halliwell, the head of Thames Valley police's major crime review team, Peter Beirne, responded that he would, "keep Halliwell in mind".

In January 2017, Thames Valley Police announced that new witnesses had come forward leading to further investigations, but no arrests had been made.

References 

1996 murders in the United Kingdom
Deaths by person in England
Female murder victims
November 1996 crimes
Unsolved murders in England
Reading, Berkshire